Vinit Sharadchandra Wadkar (born 4 February 1955) is an Indian former first-class cricketer who represented Baroda cricket team from 1978/79 to 1988/89. After retirement, he became a coach for the Baroda Cricket Association.

Career
Born on 4 February 1955 in Bombay, Wadkar played first-class cricket as a right-arm fast-medium bowler for Baroda. He appeared in a total of 35 first-class and 4 List A matches between the 1978/79 and 1988/89 seasons. He also represented West Zone in 1980/81.

Wadkar took up various coaching roles after his playing career. He was the coach of the Baroda team in early-2000s. Baroda won the 2000–01 Ranji Trophy during his tenure. He also worked as the manager of the Baroda senior team, before working as the coach of Baroda under-22 and under-19 teams of the Baroda Cricket Association.

References

External links 
 
 

1955 births
Living people
Indian cricketers
Baroda cricketers
West Zone cricketers
Indian cricket coaches